O.P. Jindal University (OPJU) is a private university located in Raigarh, Chhattisgarh, India. It was established by an Act of Legislature in the state assembly of Chhattisgarh in 2014. It was founded by the Jindal Education and Welfare Society. The OP Jindal University has UGC and AICTE affiliation.

Schools
The O.P. Jindal University has following Schools:
School of Engineering
School of Management
School of Science

Courses
The O.P. Jindal University has following Schools:
BTech- CSE, EE, MECH, MME, CIVIL Engineering
MTech
MBA
EMBA
BBA
BCom(Hons.)
MSc in Physics, Chemistry & Maths
BSc(Hons) in Physics, Chemistry,Maths & Biotechnology
PhD

See also 
 Om Prakash Jindal

References

External links

Private universities in India
Universities in Chhattisgarh
Technical universities and colleges in India
Raigarh district
2014 establishments in Chhattisgarh
Educational institutions established in 2014